The Ted Van Heemst Stakes is a Perth Racing Group 2 Thoroughbred horse race held under weight for age conditions, for horses aged three years old and upwards, over a distance of 2100 metres at Ascot Racecourse, Perth, Western Australia in December.  Prizemoney is A$250,000.

History
The race is considered the main lead up to the Perth Cup held on New Year's Day.

The distance of the race was reduced by 300 metres (2008) to coincide with the shortening of the Perth Cup from 3200 metres to 2400 metres in 2009.

In 2003 the race was run at Belmont Park Racecourse.

In 2016 the race was re-named to the Ted Van Heemst Stakes in honor of Western Australian Racing Hall of Famer Ted van Heemst.

1953 racebook

Name

1914–1919 - Grandstand Plate
1920–2015 - C B Cox Stakes
2016 onwards - Ted Van Heemst Stakes

Distance
1914–1931 - 1 miles (~2400 metres)
1932–1933 - 1 mile (~1609 metres)
1934–1936  - 1 miles (~2400 metres)
1937 - 1 mile (~1609 metres)
1938–1942 - 1 miles (~2400 metres)
1945–1951 - 1 miles (~2200 metres)
1952–1971 - 1 miles (~2400 metres)
1972–2007 – 2400 metres
 2008 onwards - 2100 metres

Grade
1914–1978 - Principal race
1979 onwards - Group 2

Winners

 2021 - Regal Power
 2020 - Truly Great
 2019 - Regal Power
 2018 - Galaxy Star
 2017 - Pounamu
 2016 - Perfect Reflection
 2015 - Delicacy
2014 - Elite Belle
 2013 - Ihtsahymn
 2012 - Mr Moet
 2011 - God Has Spoken
 2010 - Colour Correct
 2009 - Lords Ransom
 2008 - Gilded Venom
 2007 - Cats Fun
 2006 - †Daka's Gem / Scenic Shot
 2005 - Early Express
 2004 - Free At Last
 2003 - Celtus
 2002 - Bold Mirage
 2001 - Never Blue
 2000 - Old Money
 1999 - Old Cobber
 1998 - Jack Daniels
 1997 - Old Cobber
 1996 - Beau Heed
 1995 - Dark Ksar
 1994 - Sugar Raegala
 1993 - Palatious
 1992 - Mr Raku
 1991 - Mirror Magic
 1990 - Ideal Centreman
 1989 - Tawrrific
 1988 - Saratov
 1987 - Arcolad
 1986 - Haulpak's Image
 1985 - Amber's Double
 1984 - Phizam
 1983 - Haulpak's Image
 1982 - Nicholas John
 1981 - Brechin Castle
 1980 - Yashmak
 1979 - Regimental Honour
 1978 - Meliador
 1977 - Farranfore
 1976 - Tropical Chief
 1975 - Tropical Chief
 1974 - Battle Heights
 1973 - Fade
 1972 - Piping Lane
 1971 - Aubella
 1970 - Nauprius
 1969 - Jolly Aster
 1968 - Special Reward
 1967 - Hilney
 1966 - Royal Coral
 1965 - Royal Coral
 1964 - Rack And Ruin
 1963 - Cygnet Star
 1962 - Bay Count
 1961 - Little Empire
 1960 - England's Dust
 1959 - Sparkling Blue
 1958 - Zaicia
 1957 - Tribal Ring
 1956 - Vestment
 1955 - Melton Prince
 1954 - Coronate
 1953 - Moderniste
 1952 - Myolian
 1951 - Kingsman
 1950 - Dhostar
 1949 - Lady Lucia
 1948 - San Sanatra
 1947 - Kalamunda
 1946 - Lord Treat
 1945 - Smithie
 1944 - race not held
 1943 - race not held
 1942 - race not held
 1942 - Hestia
 1941 - Gay Prince
 1940 - Gay Balkan
 1939 - Gay Balkan
 1938 - Maikai
 1937 - Battery Gold
 1936 - Yaringa
 1935 - Hyperion
 1934 - D'Artagnan
 1933 - Gloaman
 1932 - Taisho
 1931 - The Dimmer
 1930 - Runabout
 1929 - Hint
 1928 - Maple
 1927 - Maple
 1926 - Eracre
 1925 - Eracre
 1924 - Lilypond
 1923 - Jolly Cosy
 1922 - Brilliant Sunshine
 1921 - Bobaris
 1920 - Eurythmic
 1919 - New Tipperary
 1918 - Bardeur
 1917 - Mistico
 1916 - High Rock
 1915 - Corstep
 1914 - Radnor

† Dead heat

See also

 List of Australian Group races
 Group races

References

Horse races in Australia
Open middle distance horse races
Sport in Perth, Western Australia